Winter is a young adult novel by John Marsden in 2000. Winter, the protagonist of the story, returns to the family estate which she left at the age of four when her parents died. She finds that everything is not as it seems when she visits her parents' graves, and she is determined to uncover the answers.

Winter has been well received by the literary audience. However, it has not received the same critical acclaim as some of Marsden's other works, including the Tomorrow series, Letters from the Inside and So Much to Tell You.

Winter was inspired by Marsden's own experience of moving into a rundown house in the country. The descriptions of Winter's house and her efforts to restore it are a real-life description of Marsden's own house, and his own efforts to restore it.

Plot summary
Winter is a headstrong 16-year-old girl whose parents died when she was 4. Since then she has lived with her mother's half sister and her husband, the Robinsons. At the start of the book, she returns to her parents’ home, drawn by a desire to know what happened to them. She was also motivated by a mysterious desire to return to the place she grew up in, surrounded by memories, notably of her parents.

Upon arriving, Winter is welcomed by the caretakers of the property, Ralph and Sylvia, but she insists on staying in her parents’ house, not theirs. She finds that her house is very run-down and negotiates with Mr. Carruthers, the manager of the estate and of the trust left to her by her parents, to renovate it. Later on, she discovers that Ralph and Sylvia have been carrying out illegal business on her property. They have been using the money from Winter's family trust for their own profit, rather than to maintain the estate, which was what they were employed to do. Upon discovering this, Winter insists that Mr Carruthers fire Ralph and Sylvia, much to the delight of many of her neighbours.

Winter also makes the effort to meet several people in the town who knew her parents. She meets Matthew Kennedy, a young man from a neighbouring farm. Their first encounter is fiesty. Winter yells at him for trespassing on her property, only to find out that she had crossed over onto his property during her walk. Throughout the novel, Winter becomes friends with Matthew.

She also meets Bruce McGill, an architect who knew her parents well. During her first meeting with Bruce, Winter discovers that she has a great aunt. She is shocked to discover this, and even more shocked that nobody told her. Everyone seemed to think that she had been told by someone else. He organises the renovation of her house and invites her to his house for dinner. There, Winter meets his daughter, Jesse, and they become friends. Jesse encourages Winter to develop her singing talents and to apply for a college singing course.

One day, Winter discovers from Sylvia that her parents are buried on the property. She is surprised by this, and especially surprised by the fact that she had never been told, nor taken to visit her parents’ graves. When she goes to find them, she discovers that her parents died 6 months apart. This is contrary to what she had been told; that they had died together in the Sydney to Hobart yacht race, and prompts her to question how her parents really died. She questions several people. First, Mr. Carruthers, who expresses his disapproval that the Robinson's did not tell her how her parents died. He then tells her that while her father did indeed die in the Sydney to Hobart yaucht race, her mother died in a shooting accident. However, Winter is puzzled by this, as her mother was a prolific shooter, and held two Australian records for marksmanship. She thinks that it is strange that she would have been so careless as to allow such an accident to occur. She continues to ask others in the district, including Mr Kennedy (Matthew Kennedy's Dad) and Dr. Couples, the doctor who attended the scene of her mother's death. However, they only confirm what others told her; that her mother died in a shooting accident.

One day she goes to see her great aunt. Her aunt does nOt want to see her, and Winter protests until she agrees to. She asks her aunt about her mother's death, but while talking to her, she remembers what happened to her mother. She, Winter, had picked up one of her mother's spare guns and shot it playfully, accidentally killing her mother. Her great aunt had shielded her from this by making it look like an accident.

At the end of the novel, Winter comes to peace with this and falls in love with one of her neighbours, Matthew Kennedy. Having completed the renovations at her parents’ home, she lives there with another neighbour, Jess. (Marsden, 2000b)

Characters
 Winter De Salis - The main character of the story, Winter was orphaned when she was four. She is a strong-willed teenager who often throws tantrums in order to get her way.
 Phillip De Salis - Winter's father, who was killed in the Sydney-Hobart yacht race.
 Phyllis De Salis - Winter's mother, who was supposedly killed in a shooting accident, but, as Winter eventually discovers, was killed by her four-year-old daughter in a tragic accident involving a loaded gun.
 Rita Harrison - Winter's rich great-aunt. She was with Winter the day of the shooting accident where Winter killed her mother. She portrayed the event as an accident to protect Winter. She also stayed out of Winter's life from this moment until the end of this novel, where Winter returns to see her.
 Mrs Stone - Rita Harrison's housekeeper. She was also present on the day of the shooting accident and helped Mrs Harrison to portray the event as an accident to protect Winter.
 Ralph and Sylvia - Hired to take care of the Warriewood estate. They are neglectful and do not do their job. They use their position as caretakers for their own profit. For example, they sell Winter's parents’ furniture and log trees illegally.
 Matthew Kennedy - A neighbour of Winter's. During their first encounters, Winter is very angry with him. She even tries to remain angry with him, but finds herself unable to, and falls in love with him. Matthew loves horses and is a very skilled horse rider.
 Mr Carruthers - As the supervisor of the Warriewood estate, Mr Carruthers manages the property and money left to Winter by her parents.
 Dr Couples - The doctor who saw Phyllis's crime scene.
 Jess McGill - Jess is Winter's friend. They meet through Jess’ father Bruce who helps in the renovation of the Warriewood estate. They bond over their love of music, and move into Warriewood as housemates at the end of the novel.

Reception 
Winter has often been compared to another of Marsden's books, Letters from the Inside because, among other things, the main characters in both books are tough, strong teenage girls. Many reviews agree that Winter appears stubborn and unreasonable at the start of the book, but that she becomes more likeable as the story progresses. Despite agreeing that the finale is satisfying and gripping, most of these reviews state that it is less surprising than the conclusion in Letters from the Inside.

Alice Pung has written a glowing endorsement of Marsden's works, stating that his success among young adults is due to the fact that he puts children, their life experience and their point of view at the centre of his writing. She remarks that Marsden's books often depict teenagers trying to take control of their lives. For example, in Winter, there is a section which talks about children killing their mothers (literally and metaphorically) in order to obtain their freedom. Moreover, Pung suggests that Marsden's adult characters are realistic. They are flawed, not perfect, and they are not the ones who solve everyone's problems. In fact, this is often left to the young adults themselves. Finally, Pung praises Marsden's understanding of life. He does not portray teenagers and young adults who are perfectly happy, extremely capable and achieve success in everything they do. Rather, Marsden's characters are resilient young people who are able to live through sorrow and the most difficult situations, which allows them to fully experience joy. According to Pung, this accurately reflects human life, which is not aimed at always being happy, but at having a wide range of experiences and emotions.

While Pung praises Marsden's realistic style, some critics have suggested that Marsden is too negative in his writing. Michaels criticises him for portraying the world as fundamentally malevolent. Scutter agrees, suggesting that the children portrayed in his writings are extremely troubled. She thinks that Marsden represents adolescence as a period of life that is completely beset with “pain, loneliness, difficulty in communication [and] lack of love”. Moreover, Michaels suggests that in Marsden's work the adolescent characters’ pain and suffering is often caused directly or indirectly by the adult characters. The adolescent characters are left to sort out their problems and find their identity alone, without any adult assistance or support. Scutter suggests that rather than creating a realistic story, as Marsden and those who enjoy his novels suggest, this is just as unrealistic as other works of fiction, such as those of Enid Blyton.

Pung defends Marsden against this criticism of writing novels with overly painful storylines. She notes that she grew up with people who had lived through war, and with others who came to Australia as unaccompanied minors. For them, the weak or absent adult characters in Marsden's novels are simply an accurate reflection of their life. Pung notes that as a society, we have no objections to Shakespeare, despite the fact that his plays portray suicide, violence, anti-Semitism and madness. She suggests that the reason for this is that Shakespeare's works are far removed from our daily life, which means that we can explain any moral atrocities as a product of the culture or the era. However, Marsden's books are set in modern-day Australia, in a context that most of his readers understand, and live in. Pung suggests that his works are criticised for this reason; because western society, particularly Australian society, does not want to accept and acknowledge that there are teenagers in our midst who suffer terribly. Some of their parents are drug addicts, others are dead, and others suffer from domestic violence. Society is afraid of corrupting young adults if they read novels in which these horrific events happen in a context that is so close to their own. Pung suggests that we should not fear this, that young adults will not be corrupted by these books unless there was already corruption within them. Furthermore, she suggests that novels about these events help young people who undergo them to understand that their life and experience matters, that they are not alone.

Inspiration 
Marsden describes the inspiration behind Winter in his book Marsden on Marsden: The Story of John Marsden's Bestselling Books. For Winter, he describes two sources of inspiration. The first source of inspiration was an estate that he bought in January 1998, the Tye Estate. When Marsden bought this estate, it was old and in need of renovation. In Winter, Winter's estate is a description of this very house. Many of the activities that Winter performs throughout the novel are activities that Marsden himself carried out in the renovation of the Tye Estate, including pulling up blackberry plants and cleaning the gutters. Some aspects of the storyline are drawn directly from Marsden's own experience. For example, when Marsden acquired the Tye Estate, people told him of the old, beautiful furniture that it used to contain. In Winter, the old, beautiful furniture from Winter's estate has also gone missing. The second source of inspiration for this novel was a short story that Marsden wrote, but never published, about a girl who was trying to uncover the truth about how her mother had died.

Like Marsden's other works So much to Tell You and Letters from the Inside, Winter is in some ways a detective novel. Marsden's love for this genre comes from his passion for Agatha Christie novels. This passion of his was especially strong during his teenage years.

Marsden also discusses his inspiration for the name of the protagonist: "Winter." He has a natural affinity for poetic names, such as River or Willow (or Winter). The name "Winter" came from a woman who came to one of the writing courses that he taught. He started writing Winter just a few months after meeting this woman at his writing course.

References

2000 Australian novels
Australian young adult novels
Australian mystery novels
Novels set in Australia
Novels by John Marsden
Pan Books books